Iviswold, also known as "The Castle", is a house originally constructed in 1869 located in what is now Rutherford, in Bergen County, New Jersey, United States. It was placed on the List of Registered Historic Places in New Jersey on November 4, 2004. The house is part of the Rutherford campus of Felician College and underwent a renovation that was completed in 2013.

History
The home was built in 1869 by Floyd W. Tomkins who called it "Hill House". It was purchased in 1887 by David Brinkerhoff Ivison who greatly expanded it and gave the home the name "Iviswold". The expansion was designed by Cornell architect William Henry Miller. Ivison died in 1903 and Iviswold was sold and resold multiple times. During this period the building was used by the Rutherford Union Club. In 1930 the building was owned by the Rutherford National Bank, then headed by Fairleigh S. Dickinson. In 1942 Fairleigh Dickinson University was created and held the first classes within Iviswold. As the university grew it built multiple college buildings around Iviswold, but by the late 1980s the college was outgrowing their Rutherford campus, which was closed in 1994 and sold along with Iviswold to Felician University in 1997. Felician University spent several years restoring the building to its original condition. The New Jersey Historic Trust contributed $1,550,000 to the restoration project.

Construction
The original home was a two-story stone house with a mansard roof. The 1887 remodeling of the house was inspired by the Château de Chaumont in Loir-et-Cher, France. The remodeling turned the building into a three-story turreted mansion with 25 rooms, including balconies, a music room and a porte-cochère. Local brownstone was used in the construction of the exterior walls. In the 1930s, an indoor pool was installed with a water tower built into the structure to supply it. In the 1970s, when Fairleigh Dickinson was using the building for classroom space, the college covered up much of the original interior with drop ceilings and partition walls.

See also 

 National Register of Historic Places listings in Bergen County, New Jersey

References

External links
Felician College

Houses on the National Register of Historic Places in New Jersey
Houses in Bergen County, New Jersey
William Henry Miller buildings
Houses completed in 1869
Rutherford, New Jersey
Felician College
1869 establishments in New Jersey
New Jersey Register of Historic Places